This is a list of breweries in the Black Country. The Black Country is a region in the Midlands of England. Although its boundaries are not precisely defined, for the purposes of this list, the Black Country will be defined as the extending over the 4 Local authority areas of Wolverhampton, Dudley, Sandwell and Walsall.

List of breweries 

458 Brewery. Brewery at Wollaston.
 AJ's Ales. Brewery sited in Walsall.
 Angel Ales. Brewery sited at Cradley.
 Backyard. Brewery sited at Walsall.

 Banks's. Brewery sited in Wolverhampton.
 Bathams. Brewery sited at Brierley Hill.
Beat Brewery. Brewery sited in Lye, Stourbridge.
 Beowulf. Brewery sited at Brownhills (north of Walsall).
 Black Country Ales. Brewery sited at Lower Gornal
 Blue Bear. Brewery at Smethwick.
 Broughs.Brewery at Wolverhampton.
 Craddock's. Brewery sited at Stourbridge.
 Fixed Wheel. Brewery sited in Blackheath. 
 Fownes. Brewery sited in Upper Gornal. 
 Green Duck. Brewery sited at Stourbridge.
 Holdens. Brewery sited at Woodsetten.
 Newbridge. Brewery sited at Bilston.
 Olde Swan (Ma Pardoes). Brewery in Netherton.
 Pig Iron. Brewery sited at Blackheath.
Punchline. Brewery at Wolverhampton.
 Sadler's. Brewery sited in Lye.
 Sarah Hughes. Brewery sited at Sedgley.
 Toll End. Brewery sited in Tipton.
 Webster's. Brewery sited at Wollaston.

References

Further reading
 Joseph McKenna, Black Country Breweries, The History Press, Stroud, 2005. 

Breweries
English cuisine-related lists
Lists of breweries in the United Kingdom